The meridian 81° west of Greenwich is a line of longitude that extends from the North Pole across the Arctic Ocean, North America, the Atlantic Ocean, the Caribbean Sea, Panama, the Pacific Ocean, South America, the Southern Ocean, and Antarctica to the South Pole.

The 81st meridian west forms a great circle with the 99th meridian east.

From Pole to Pole
Starting at the North Pole and heading south to the South Pole, the 81st meridian west passes through:

{| class="wikitable plainrowheaders"
! scope="col" width="120" | Co-ordinates
! scope="col" | Country, territory or sea
! scope="col" | Notes
|-
| style="background:#b0e0e6;" | 
! scope="row" style="background:#b0e0e6;" | Arctic Ocean
| style="background:#b0e0e6;" |
|-
| 
! scope="row" | 
| Nunavut — Ellesmere Island
|-
| style="background:#b0e0e6;" | 
! scope="row" style="background:#b0e0e6;" | Jones Sound
| style="background:#b0e0e6;" |
|-
| 
! scope="row" | 
| Nunavut — Devon Island
|-
| style="background:#b0e0e6;" | 
! scope="row" style="background:#b0e0e6;" | Lancaster Sound
| style="background:#b0e0e6;" |
|-
| style="background:#b0e0e6;" | 
! scope="row" style="background:#b0e0e6;" | Navy Board Inlet
| style="background:#b0e0e6;" | Passing just west of Bylot Island, Nunavut,  (at )
|-
| 
! scope="row" | 
| Nunavut — Baffin Island
|-valign-"top"
| style="background:#b0e0e6;" | 
! scope="row" style="background:#b0e0e6;" | Foxe Basin
| style="background:#b0e0e6;" | Passing just east of the Melville Peninsula, Nunavut,  (at )
|-
| style="background:#b0e0e6;" | 
! scope="row" style="background:#b0e0e6;" | Foxe Channel
| style="background:#b0e0e6;" |
|-
| 
! scope="row" | 
| Nunavut — Bell Peninsula, Southampton Island
|-
| style="background:#b0e0e6;" | 
! scope="row" style="background:#b0e0e6;" | Hudson Bay
| style="background:#b0e0e6;" |
|-
| style="background:#b0e0e6;" | 
! scope="row" style="background:#b0e0e6;" | James Bay
| style="background:#b0e0e6;" |
|-
| 
! scope="row" | 
| Nunavut — Akimiski Island
|-
| style="background:#b0e0e6;" | 
! scope="row" style="background:#b0e0e6;" | James Bay
| style="background:#b0e0e6;" |
|-
| 
! scope="row" | 
| Ontario — passing through Georgian Bay, Lake Huron
|-
| style="background:#b0e0e6;" | 
! scope="row" style="background:#b0e0e6;" | Lake Erie
| style="background:#b0e0e6;" |
|-valign="top"
| 
! scope="row" | 
|-
| style="background:#b0e0e6;" | 
! scope="row" style="background:#b0e0e6;" | Atlantic Ocean
| style="background:#b0e0e6;" |
|-
| 
! scope="row" | 
| Florida
|-
| style="background:#b0e0e6;" | 
! scope="row" style="background:#b0e0e6;" | Florida Bay
| style="background:#b0e0e6;" |
|-
| 
! scope="row" | 
| Florida — Key Vaca
|-
| style="background:#b0e0e6;" | 
! scope="row" style="background:#b0e0e6;" | Atlantic Ocean
| style="background:#b0e0e6;" | Straits of Florida
|-
| 
! scope="row" | 
|
|-valign="top"
| style="background:#b0e0e6;" | 
! scope="row" style="background:#b0e0e6;" | Caribbean Sea
| style="background:#b0e0e6;" | Passing just east of the island of Grand Cayman,  (at )
|-
| 
! scope="row" | 
|Near Santiago in Veraguas.
|-
| style="background:#b0e0e6;" | 
! scope="row" style="background:#b0e0e6;" | Pacific Ocean
| style="background:#b0e0e6;" |
|-
| 
! scope="row" | 
| For about 1 km near the city of Salinas
|-
| style="background:#b0e0e6;" | 
! scope="row" style="background:#b0e0e6;" | Pacific Ocean
| style="background:#b0e0e6;" | Gulf of Guayaquil
|-
| 
! scope="row" | 
|
|-
| style="background:#b0e0e6;" | 
! scope="row" style="background:#b0e0e6;" | Pacific Ocean
| style="background:#b0e0e6;" |
|-
| 
! scope="row" | 
|
|-valign="top"
| style="background:#b0e0e6;" | 
! scope="row" style="background:#b0e0e6;" | Pacific Ocean
| style="background:#b0e0e6;" | Passing just west of Alejandro Selkirk Island,  (at )
|-
| style="background:#b0e0e6;" | 
! scope="row" style="background:#b0e0e6;" | Southern Ocean
| style="background:#b0e0e6;" |
|-
| 
! scope="row" | Antarctica
| Territory claimed by 
|-
|}

See also
80th meridian west
82nd meridian west

w081 meridian west